Enias Kalogeris (Greek: Αινείας Καλογέρης; born 9 October 1990) is a Greco–Albanian footballer who plays as a midfielder for Nea Ionia football club.

Career

Kalogeris started his football career from the youth ranks of AEK Athens F.C. Then, in 2010, he was given to Olympiakos Chersonisou, at the Greek Football League 2, where he made 18 appearances and scored one goal. A season later, he moved to ΑΟ Thiva, an amateur football club. From there, he signed with the Greek Giant, AEK Athens F.C. to play for four years, wearing the kit of the first team. His contract with the team was terminated on 16 July 2014.

Honours
AEK Athens
Football League 2: 1
 2014(6th Group)

References

External links
 
 Profile and statistics at myplayer.gr 

1990 births
Living people
Greek footballers
Association football midfielders
Super League Greece players
AEK Athens F.C. players